"Never Before" is a song by British rock band Deep Purple, which appears on their 1972 album Machine Head. It was also released as a single and reached #35 in the UK.

A promo video was made for the song in 1972. The single version of the song is an edit of the album version and lasts 3:30.

Live performances
"Never Before" has rarely been performed live. The only live recording of this song appears on Deep Purple in Concert, which was recorded at the time of the single release, a week or so before Machine Head was released.

Deep Purple performed "Never Before" on tour in 2004, when they played the whole Machine Head album.

Personnel
Ian Gillan – vocals
Ritchie Blackmore – guitar
Roger Glover – bass guitar
Jon Lord – keyboards
Ian Paice – drums

References

Deep Purple songs
1972 singles
Songs written by Ian Gillan
Songs written by Roger Glover
Songs written by Ritchie Blackmore
Songs written by Jon Lord
Songs written by Ian Paice